Universitatea Craiova was a professional football club based in Craiova, Dolj County, Romania. Between 1948 and 1991, Universitatea won four national titles and five national cups. In addition to their domestic success, their reputation as a major club in the country was established by being the first Romanian team to reach the semi-finals of a UEFA tournament and remain the only one to have knocked out at least one club from each of five strongest countries in European football—England, France, Germany, Italy and Spain.

It acted as a football section for the CSU Craiova sports club of which it was part of until 1991, when its berth in the league championship was taken by FC U Craiova following a privatisation scheme. Generally considered the same entity with the old club, FC U continued its tradition for the next two decades, but was reorganised several times and retroactively deemed an unofficial successor.

In 2013, the sports club refounded its football department, which asserts the history and trophies of the original Universitatea Craiova. CS Universitatea Craiova has in truth been backed up by some court orders and the Liga Profesionistă de Fotbal, but the record remains subject of legal dispute with the also reestablished FC U team and uncertainty persists.

Before privatisation

Early years of football in Craiova (1921–1958)

The football history in the city of Craiova began in 1921, when the first teams were founded: Craiovan Craiova and Rovine Grivița Craiova. In 1940, the two sides merged in what resulted to be one of the most successful Romanian clubs of the Interwar period, FC Craiova, which was also the first team of the city that won the Romanian football championship. However, the 1942–43 title is not recognized officially by FRF and LPF due to the unofficial character of the competition in that season.

Immediately after the foundation of the first university education institution – the Institute of Machines and Electric Devices – a group of teachers and students founded CSU Craiova in 1948, a sports club with athletics, volleyball, handball, table tennis, chess and football sections.

Under the coordination of the Ministry of Public Education and of the National Union of Students in Romania, the football team UNSR Craiova (Uniunea Națională a Studenților din România) was formed and enrolled in the county championship. The first official match was held at Filiași on 5 September 1948, "the Students" being defeated 6–3. The white-blue shirt was dressed for the first time by the following line-up: Dumitrescu – Rădulescu, Mihăilă I, Carli – Ozon, Mihăilă II – Sabin, Ilie, Bădescu, Tudor, Serghi, under the command of head coach N. Polojinski.

In 1950 the football section changed its name from UNSR Craiova to CSU Craiova, the same name as the parent club. In 1951, CSU Craiova defeated with 6–0 the local rival, Constructorul Craiova, in what was going to be the first official match played in Cupa României. In 1953 the club changed its name again, this time in Știința Craiova, and one year later at the Divizia B promotion play-off, hosted in Arad, Știința, coached by Nicolae Oțeleanu, qualified for the 1955 season, thus promoting for the first time in its history at the level of the second echelon. The club relegated back to Divizia C after only one season and remained at that level until 1958.

Universitatea, a rising team (1958–1970)

In 1958 Știința promoted for the second time in the second league after a fight on the knife edge in the 3rd series of the Divizia C against Unirea Râmnicu Vâlcea, at the end of the season both teams finished with 34 points, but with the advantage of direct matches for the white and blue team. In the first season after promotion, Craiova ended only on 13th place, out of 14, but progresses have been made in the next seasons: 1959–60 – 10th, 1960–61 – 2nd, but far away from the 1st place occupied by Dinamo Pitești, 1961–62 – 4th, 1962–63 – 4th. 1963–64 Divizia B season was a dramatic one, with a four-way fight for promotion in the first series of the second league. At the end the Students won the promotion, but ended at the same number of points with the 2nd place, Metalul Târgoviște, one point in front of 3rd place, Poiana Câmpina and two points over 4th place, Dinamo Bacău. This 'historical act' was 'signed' by the head coach Nicolae Oțeleanu and following players: Dumitrescu, Vasilescu, Geleriu, Lungan, Deliu, Bărbulescu, Tetea, Ganga, Anton, Lovin, Onea, Vişan, Stanciu, Papuc, C.Stesnescu, A.Stenescu.

As with the previous promotions, the first Divizia A season was a very hard one for the white and blues who saved from relegation in the last rounds, with just one point more than the first relegated team, Minerul Baia Mare. The end of the next season found Știința ranked 8th, in the middle of the standing, and they were already putting the first bases of a team able to issue claims to the title.

In the summer of 1966, the club changed its name again, this time from Știința Craiova to Universitatea Craiova, a name that will remain forever on the lips of all football lovers and team supporters from Romania. Nevertheless, supporters continued to include in their chants and their encouragements the name Știința. In the difficult moments of the games it is known that Universitatea supporters tend to chant: Hei, hei, hai Știința!

As Universitatea followed seasons of contrasting results, in some of them the team delighted the audience in others less, but has remained in the first division, regardless of the situation: 1966–67 – 3rd, 1967–68 – 11th, 1968–69 – 7th, 1969–70 – 4th. There have been 12 years of building and finishing a team that would delight the audience for the next two decades.

"The Champion of a Great Love" (1970–1979)

Craiova started the 70's with a team built around Ion Oblemenco and with players of a certain value as: Petre Deselnicu, Teodor Țarălungă, Lucian Strâmbeanu or Dumitru Marcu, among others. The start of the decade was not the most convincing, but a decent one, 6th place at the end of the 1970–71 season and 8th place at the end of the 1971–72. The first attempts of the students to shine took place in the 1972–73 season, they finished at the same number of points with Dinamo București, the title of the champion was taken by Dinamo, due to a better goal difference. This season remained in the history as the season of the birth of the nickname: "the Champion of a Great Love", a nickname created by the poet Adrian Păunescu, a big fan of the team from Bănie, he named Dinamo only as the champion of the country, indicating somewhat the suspicious circumstances, in which it was said, that Craiova lost the title.

In the 1973–74 season the title fight was again between Universitatea and Dinamo, but this time Craiova won the title with an advance of a point in front of Dinamo, being the first team of a University that won a national title in Europe. The achievement was more fabulous as Dinamo was considered as a spoiled team of the communist regime, which often influenced the results as well and also after the last season's incidents, Universitatea was increasingly seen as a representative of the people, of the simple man, in the struggle with the communist regime, of pure football and football played on the pitch against the one dominated by arrangements and influences, so the Champion of a Great Love phrase has gained increasing power, including in the years to come. The historical squad that won the first title was coached by Constantin Cernăianu and Constantin Oțet and had the following players included: Oprea, Manta – Niculescu, Bădin, Deselnicu, Velea, Strâmbeanu, Ivan, Niță, Balaci, Berneanu, Țarălungă, Oblemenco, Bălan, Pană, Boc, Ștefănescu, Marcu, Stăncescu, Kiss, Chivu, Negrilă and Constantinescu.

Followed a 1974–75 season that brought the first UEFA European Cup presence, a double match against Swedish team Åtvidaberg, lost 3–4 on aggregate, but a decent 3rd place at the end of the championship. 1975–76 season brought a significant fall, the team ending the season only on the 6th place and announcing a change of generation in the team. In the last season of the legendary Ion Oblemenco in the white and blue shirt of Universitatea, the expectations were no longer so high, but the team from Craiova amazed the audience again, winning for the first time in its history the Romanian Cup in a final against Steaua București, being the way of Oblemenco's generation to take good-bye from the supporters. Also in the Divizia A the team finished on 3rd place.

With the generation exchange made, Universitatea continued to impress in 1978 by defending his Romanian Cup trophy, won a year ago, this time against Olimpia Satu Mare and a 6th place in the league. 1978–79 season was ended on the 4th place and in the UEFA Cup Winners' Cup the club was eliminated in the first round by Fortuna Düsseldorf.

Craiova Maxima (1979–1991)

Craiova Maxima ("The Maximum Craiova") was the second golden generation of Universitatea and a team that recorded, especially in the early and mid 80's, the most notable continental performance in the history of the club. It was a squad composed by a lot of players that grew up in the proximity of the first golden team and also this team gave a large part of the 'skeleton' of the Romania national football team such as: Ilie Balaci, Rodion Cămătaru, Costică Ștefănescu, Zoltan Crișan, Ion Geolgău, Aurel Beldeanu, Costică Donose and Silviu Lung, among others.

At the end of the 1979–80 has been crowned the champion of Romania for the second time. Squad: Boldici, Lung – Negrilă, Tilihoi, Ștefănescu, Ungureanu, Balaci, Beldeanu, Crişan, Donose, Cămătaru, Geolgău, Cârțu, Irimescu, Purima and Ciupitu – coaches Valentin Stănescu and Ion Oblemenco. In this formula Universitatea made a great UEFA Cup campaign by eliminating Wiener SC and Leeds United until was hardly stopped in the third round by German side Borussia Mönchengladbach, 1–2 on aggregate.

The team caught wings and made a fantastic 1980–81 season, managing the historical double, the cup and the championship. As a result of this performance, the students qualified for the 1981–82 European Cup where Craiova Maxima became more and more visible by eliminating Olympiacos and KB, being stopped in the quarter-finals by Bayern Munich, 1–3 in aggregate, an historical performance for the Romanian football at that time.

The long-standing presence in the European Cups affected the team, which finished only on 2nd place, but qualifying in the UEFA Cup and writing history throughout the 1982–83 season, being the first team in the history of Romania that qualified in a European Cup semi-finals. Under the management of Constantin Oțet and Nicolae Ivan the white and blues took out important names in European football, such as Fiorentina (Serie A runners-up), Bordeaux and Kaiserslautern. In the semi-final, Universitatea encountered Benfica, two times European champions and three times European Cup finalists at that time. After two draws, the Portuguese side advanced to the final on aggregate away goals. In the Divizia A, the team finished again on the 2nd place.

The following years have found Universitatea Craiova as a constant presence in the first part of the standing: 1983–84 – 3rd, 1984–85 – 4th, 1985–86 – 3rd, 1986–87 – 5th, 1987–88 – 5th, 1988–89 – 5th and 1988–89 – 3rd. Also the team had a constant presence in the European Cups eliminating remarkable teams such as: Real Betis, Olympiacos, AS Monaco or Galatasaray, but they never qualified far than the third round again. The Students also lost a Romanian Cup final in 1985, 1–2 against Steaua București.

In 1991, CS Universitatea Craiova touched again the peak of the Romanian football, when the event is being held again. Prunea, Mănăilă, Săndoi, Ad. Popescu, Mogoşanu, Ciurea, Olaru, Cristescu, Zamfir, Badea, Pigulea, Agalliu, Craioveanu and Neagoe were the last players that have kissed the championship trophy. Along with coaches Sorin Cârţu and Ștefan Cioacă.

Successors

FC U Craiova

In 1991, Universitatea Craiova conquered its last national title and Romanian Cup, under the management of Sorin Cârțu.  However, in the same year, the CS Universitatea Craiova sports club dissolved its football section and Fotbal Club Universitatea Craiova continued its tradition until the early 2010s (until 1994, the club was still controlled by the Ministry of National Education). 
After disappointing results in the 1991–92 European Cup and 1992–93 UEFA Cup campaigns FC Universitatea Craiova saw domestic glory by winning the 1992–93 Cupa României and finishing on the podium the same year. After that they will go on the 1993–94 European Cup Winners' Cup campaign where they will be eliminated by french side Paris Saint-Germain.
The next seasons Craiova will finish second in the league in 1993–94 and 1994–95 respectively and will lose two cup finals in 1993–94 and 1997–98, also participating in 1994–95 UEFA Cup  and 1995–96 Intertoto Cup.

FC Universitatea Craiova started the 2000s playing a Cup final in 2000 and with participations in the 2000–01 UEFA Cup and 2001 Intertoto Cup. 
The next 5 seasons saw Craiova finishing between 4th and 8th places but relegating in 2005. The team will go back up after one season in Divizia B. The next three seasons saw Craiova between the 9th and 7th places. During these years in the 2008–09 Liga 1 with  Nicolò Napoli as manager and players like Costea brothers (Florin Costea and Mihai Costea), Andrei Prepeliță or Julius Wobay, Craiova had a decent run winning against rivals Dinamo and defending champions CFR Cluj and almost qualifying for the 2009–10 UEFA Europa League. The next year Craiova relegated again and legal problems started to appear. On 20 July 2011, the club was temporarily excluded by the Romanian Football Federation for failing to withdraw their dispute with former coach Victor Piţurcă from a civil court, as per article 57 of the FRF statute which states that the Football Federation solves all the sports lawsuits. However, the article allows disputes regarding employment contracts to be adjudicated in civil court. The exclusion decision was approved by the FRF General Assembly on 14 May 2012. All of the squad players were declared free agents and signed with other clubs.

In the meantime, in the summer of 2013, both FC Universitatea and CS Universitatea officially rejoined the Liga II competition, Series II. The first match of this team was the victory against SCM Argeşul Piteşti in the fourth round of the Romanian Cup, qualifying to the fifth round of the competition. FC Universitatea and CS Universitatea competed in the same league and met in two games that year, both ended 0–0. With a more stable and sustainable financing, CS Universitatea promoted to Liga I that year, while FC Universitatea withdrew from the competition. The company operating the team went bankrupt, so FC Universitatea no longer appeared in any competition. In 2017, Adrian Mititelu created a new company and his team was allowed to participate in the top regional tier of Dolj County. The team consisted of a lot of young prospects and experienced players that played for the team in the past like Ovidiu Dănănae and Mihai Dina and Nicolò Napoli in his fifth spell as a manager.

CS Universitatea Craiova

On 20 July 2011, the Romanian Football Federation decided to disaffiliate FC Universitatea Craiova, but the decision was attacked in court. Consequently, in the summer of 2013, local authorities of Craiova, supported by Pavel Badea, and associated with Club Sportiv U Craiova SA, refounded the football section of CS U Craiova. CS U claimed that it owns all of the Universitatea honours, and that the sports club did not offer its records to FC U Craiova, which was considered a new club; this was confirmed in justice in June 2016 and reaffirmed by LPF in November 2017. Therefore, CS Universitatea Craiova is the rightful owner of the brand and records—excepting the 1992–93 Cupa României, claimed but not officially part of CS U's honours.

On 14 August 2013, CS Universitatea Craiova was provisionally affiliated to the Romanian Football Federation, following complications with licensing file. After resolving the issues, the club was introduced in Liga II, the second tier of the Romanian league system. After the promotion, Universitatea ended the 2014–15 campaign on the 5th place. A 4th place at the end of the 2016–17 season ensured return to European competitions. The comeback brought an important opponent in the third qualifying round of the UEFA Europa League, Italian side A.C. Milan, Craiova leaving the competition after 0–3 on aggregate. On 27 May 2018, Universitatea won its first trophy since being refounded after beating second tier club Hermannstadt in the Cupa României final.

References
Notes

Citations

History of association football clubs in Romania
CS Universitatea Craiova
FC U Craiova 1948